Christine Nogueira do Reis Tonietto, better known as Chris Tonietto (Rio de Janeiro, May 14, 1991) is a Brazilian lawyer and politician.

Biography

Christine Nogueira dos Reis Tonietto was born in Rio de Janeiro on May 14, 1991. As a Roman Catholic lawyer and a member of the cultural center Centro Dom Bosco, in 2017 she staged an action against the humorous Porta dos Fundos, by virtue of its video parodying the sky in Catholicism. In the elections of October 7, 2018, Tonietto was elected federal deputy of the Social Liberal Party for the Rio de Janeiro, with 38,129 votes (0.50% of the valid votes).

Tonietto opposes abortion in all cases.

References

External Links
Chris Tonietto on Facebook
Chris Tonietto on Instagram
 Chris Tonietto on Twitter
 Profile in the Chamber of Deputies

1991 births
21st-century Brazilian lawyers
Brazilian Roman Catholics
Conservatism in Brazil
Liberal Party (Brazil, 2006) politicians
Social Liberal Party (Brazil) politicians
Living people
Politicians from Rio de Janeiro (city)
Members of the Chamber of Deputies (Brazil) from Rio de Janeiro (state)